Trinamool Chhatra Parishad (abbreviated AITCP, WBTMCP or West Bengal Trinamool Chhatra Parishad) popularly known as or “TMCP” is the student wing of All India Trinamool Congress, a major political party of India. It was formed in 1998 after the formation of Trinamool Congress, splitting from Congress.

TMCP is one of the major student organizations in West Bengal and has won student union election in many colleges of West Bengal.

Important student leaders 
 Abhishek Banerjee, General Secretary AITC
 Trinankur Bhattacharya( President: WBTMCP)
 Santosh Misra ( Secretary: WBTMCP)

See Also
 Mamata Banerjee
 Abhishek Banerjee
 All India Trinamool Congress

References 

Trinamool Congress
Student wings of political parties in India
Youth wings of political parties in India
Political parties established in 1998
1998 establishments in West Bengal